Helena Doukaina Angelina (Helene Doukaina Angelina) was a Greek noblewoman of Thessaly and Queen-consort of medieval Serbia.

Her parents were John I Doukas of Thessaly and his wife Hypomone (a daughter of the Thessalian Vlach chieftain Taronas). In ca. 1273/76, Helena married Serbian king Stefan Milutin (r. 1282–1321), but Milutin abandoned her in ca. 1283. It is possible that their sons were Kings Stefan Konstantin and Stefan Dečanski. It seems Helena then returned to Greece.

References

Sources
 
 

13th-century births
13th-century Byzantine people
People from Thessaly
Medieval Thessaly
Nemanjić dynasty
Byzantine queens consort
Serbian queens consort
Medieval Serbian people of Greek descent
Helena
13th-century Greek people
13th-century Greek women
13th-century Byzantine women